Skinner v. State of Oklahoma, ex rel. Williamson, 316 U.S. 535 (1942), is a unanimous United States Supreme Court ruling that held that laws permitting the compulsory sterilization of criminals are unconstitutional as it violates a person's rights given under the 14th Amendment of the United States Constitution, specifically the Equal Protection Clause, as well as the Due Process Clause. The relevant Oklahoma law applied to "habitual criminals", but the law excluded white-collar crimes from carrying sterilization penalties.

Background
In 1935, the Supreme Court of Oklahoma ruled in favor of the Habitual Criminal Sterilization Act, which allowed the state to impose a sentence of compulsory sterilization as part of their judgment against individuals who had been convicted three or more times of crimes "amounting to felonies involving moral turpitude". Exceptions to this ruling were those who committed what are considered white-collar crimes. 

All defendants were provided with a jury trial organized by the State Attorney. The jury was asked whether the defendant was a habitual criminal according to the definition of the act and, if so, to conclude that sterilization would have no other negative effect on the defendant's health; if the jury so determined, the defendant would be punished by sterilization. Most punitive sterilization laws, including the Oklahoma statute, prescribed vasectomy for males as the method of rendering the individual infertile, and salpingectomy for females.

The Sterilization Act was first put to use in May 1936. Hubert Moore, a five-time convict, was the first individual the state had given an approved petition for sterilization. When other prisoners heard the news of the approved petition, they rioted and attempted to escape. Hubert Moore escaped from prison in June 1936.

The second petition approved was for Jack T. Skinner, convicted once for stealing chickens and twice for armed robbery. In October 1936, he was convicted a fourth time and sentenced to sterilization. Skinner's lawyers, Heba Irwin Aston and Guy Andrews, took their appeal to the Supreme Court of Oklahoma, claiming jeopardization of Skinner's rights as given under the 14th Amendment of the United States Constitution. The Supreme Court of Oklahoma ruled against the appeal 5 to 4, and maintained the sentence of sterilization.

Skinner's lawyers challenged the ruling of the Supreme Court of Oklahoma by bringing an appeal to the United States Supreme Court. The oral arguments were heard May 6, 1942 and the Opinion of the court was given on June 1, 1942.

Opinion of the Supreme Court
The Court held unanimously that the Act violated the Equal Protection Clause of the Fourteenth Amendment, because white-collar crimes, such as embezzlement, were excluded from the Act's jurisdiction. 

Justice William O. Douglas concluded:

Furthermore, because of the social and biological implications of reproduction and the irreversibility of sterilization operations, Justice Douglas also stressed that compulsory sterilization laws in general should be held to strict scrutiny:

In a separate concurring opinion, Chief Justice Harlan F. Stone stated that while he concurred with Justice Douglas's opinion, he believed that, in his opinion, the Act violated Due Process Clause, specifically procedural due process, more than it violated the 14th Amendment. His main argument was that in order for legislation to convict and sterilize the defendant, there needed to be proof that criminal behavior could be inherited genetically, which the court had no proof of at the time. He cited Buck v. Bell, saying that because it has been proven that feeblemindedness is inheritable, sterilization is acceptable, but in the case of Skinner v. Oklahoma, it was not.

Aftermath
The only types of sterilization which the ruling immediately ended were punitive sterilization; it did not directly comment on compulsory sterilization of the mentally disabled or mentally ill and was not a strict overturning of the Court's ruling in Buck v. Bell (1927). Furthermore, most of the over 64,000 sterilizations performed in the US under the aegis of eugenics legislation were not in prison institutions or performed on convicted criminals; punitive sterilizations made up only negligible amounts of the total operations performed, as most states and prison officials were nervous about their legal status, which were not affirmed in Buck v. Bell specifically, as possible violations of the Eighth ("cruel and unusual punishment") or Fourteenth Amendments ("Due Process" and "Equal Protection Clauses"). Compulsory sterilizations of the mentally disabled and mentally ill continued in the US in significant numbers until the early 1960s. Although many of their laws stayed on the books for many years longer, the last known forced sterilization in the United States occurred in 1981 in Oregon. Federal law prohibits use of federal funds to sterilize "any mentally incompetent or institutionalized individual", but states including California use state funds for tubal ligations. A 2013 report showed that between 2006 and 2010, at least 148 women were sterilized after childbirth while incarcerated in two California prisons. In violation of state rules passed in 1994, none of the cases were reviewed by a state oversight committee.

Over a third of all compulsory sterilizations in the United States (over 22,670) took place after Skinner v. Oklahoma. The 1942 ruling, however, created a nervous legal atmosphere regarding these other forms of sterilizations and put a heavy damper on sterilization rates which had boomed since the Buck v. Bell ruling in 1927. After the discovery of the Nazi atrocities done in the name of eugenics, including the compulsory sterilization of 450,000 individuals in barely more than a decade, under a sterilization law, which drew heavy inspiration from American statutes, and the close association between eugenics and racism, eugenics, as an ideology, lost almost all public favor.  In Equal Protection analysis, Skinner applied the compelling state interest test to punitive sterilization, and Buck applied the less rigorous rational basis test to compulsory sterilization of the mentally disabled.

In 2002, the United States Court of Appeals for the Ninth Circuit held that an inmate, incarcerated by the California Department of Corrections and serving a life sentence, was not permitted to inseminate his wife artificially because "the right to procreate is fundamentally inconsistent with incarceration". The Appellate Court distinguished the case from Skinner v. Oklahoma because "the right to procreate while incarcerated and the right to be free from surgical sterilization by prison officials are two very different things".

See also
List of United States Supreme Court cases by the Stone Court
List of United States Supreme Court cases, volume 316
Sex-related court cases in the United States
Stump v. Sparkman, 435 U.S. 349 (1978)

References

External links

Case summary from Oyez Project
Case description on LexRoll Encyclopedia

1942 in United States case law
United States Supreme Court cases
United States reproductive rights case law
United States substantive due process case law
United States equal protection case law
Eugenics in the United States
United States Supreme Court cases of the Stone Court
Compulsory sterilization
Legal history of Oklahoma